Trademark stuffing is a form of keyword stuffing, an unethical search engine optimization method used by webmasters and Internet marketers in order to manipulate search engine ranking results served by websites such as Google, Yahoo! and Microsoft Bing. A key characteristic of trademark stuffing is the intent of the infringer to confuse search engines and Internet users into thinking a website or web page is owned or otherwise authorized by the trademark owner. Trademark stuffing does not include using trademarks on third party website pages with the boundaries of Fair Use. When used effectively, trademark stuffing enables infringing websites to capture search engine traffic that may have otherwise been received by an authorized website or trademark owner.

Trademark stuffing is most often used to manipulate organic search engine optimization, however, can also be used with other forms of search engine marketing, such as within the text of pay-per-click advertisements. Using another's trademark or service mark as a keyword without permission is ill-advised, could constitute trademark infringement and result in other claims.

Trademark stuffing may be accomplished by placing trademarked text with the following areas of a web page:

 Page Title
 Meta Description
 Meta Keywords
 Author Tags
 Page text content
 Hidden page text content
 Image alt tags
 Within a URL

By extension, another form of keyword stuffing involves placing trademarks within the anchor text of third party websites, then pointing the website address within the linked text back to an infringing website. An anchor link signals to Internet users that the link points to a website address relating to the trademark. Additionally, search engines are widely known to use anchor text linking data within their search engine ranking algorithms. Thus, trademark-stuffed anchor links signal relationship information to the search engines, thereby increasing the chance that an infringing website could achieve higher organic search rankings for a trademark keyword phrase.

References

Search engine optimization